Claës Ture Wersäll (12 August 1883 – 18 December 1965) was a Swedish gymnast who won a bronze medal in the tug of war event at the 1906 Summer Olympics. The team consisted of five gymnasts, two weightlifters and a javelin thrower.

Wersäll was born to the Swedish Finance Minister Claës Wersäll and Charlotta Wersäll, in a family of 10 siblings. Two of his eight brothers, Claës-Axel and Gustaf also competed at Summer Olympics.

References

1883 births
1965 deaths
Sportspeople from Stockholm
Tug of war competitors at the 1906 Intercalated Games
Medalists at the 1906 Intercalated Games